Natalia Valeeva (born 15 November 1969 in Tîrnauca, Transnistria) is a naturalized Italian archer. She is a five-time Olympian and former world number one, and a native of Moldova, having represented the Unified Team, Moldova and Italy, at the Olympic Games of 1992, 1996, 2000, 2004, 2008 and 2012. She won the individual and team bronze medals in the 1992 Olympic Games.

Personal life
Valeeva is the mother of twins, and is married to an Italian native (Roberto Cocchi). She is sponsored by Hoyt Archery and Easton Technical Products as a member of their Pro Staff.

1992 Summer Olympics

Valeeva represented the Unified Team and won the individual bronze medal with Cho Youn-Jeong and Kim Soo-Nyung, both representing South Korea, winning gold and silver. She also won the team bronze medal with Lyudmila Arzhannikova and Khatouna Kvrivichvili with South Korea winning gold and China winning silver.

1996 Summer Olympics
Valeeva represented Moldova at the 1996 Summer Olympics, where she was defeated in the third round.

2000 Summer Olympics
Valeeva represented Italy at the 2000 Summer Olympics, gaining seventh place in both the individual and the team event.

2004 Summer Olympics
In her next Olympic appearance, Valeeva represented Italy at the 2004 Summer Olympics where she placed 9th in the women's individual ranking round with a 72-arrow score of 650. In the first round of elimination in high winds and difficult conditions, she faced 56th-ranked Jasmin Figueroa of the Philippines. The biggest upset of the round, this match saw Valeeva lose to Figueroa 132–130 in the 18-arrow match, dropping all the way to 53rd overall in women's individual archery.

2007 World Championships
In the World Championships of 2007, in Leipzig, Germany, Valeeva won the gold medal, beating Korean top archer Park, holder of the FITA world record for the qualifying round of 1405 points (of a possible 1440). This was the second gold medal in the outdoor World Championships for Valeeva, the first one in 1995. So far in her career, Valeeva has collected 7 individual gold medals in World Championships (indoor and outdoor), and she is one of the few archers in the world to have won the Indoor and Outdoor World Championship in the same year, in 1995.

2008 Summer Olympics
At the 2008 Summer Olympics in Beijing Valeeva finished her ranking round with a total of 634 points. This gave her the 30th seed for the final competition bracket in which she faced Anastassiya Bannova in the first round, beating the archer from Kazakhstan with 107–105. In the second round she came close, but was eliminated by third seed Joo Hyun-Jung with 110–108. Together with Pia Carmen Maria Lionetti and Elena Tonetta she also took part in the team event. With her 634 score from the ranking round combined with the 613 of Lionetti and the 595 of Tonetta the Italian team was in 9th position after the ranking round. In the first round they were too strong for the team from Chinese Taipei, beating them with 215–211. However, in the quarter final they were eliminated by the eventual gold medalists from South Korea, despite a 217 points score. The Koreans managed to shoot a new World Record of 231 points to advance to the semi final.

2012 Summer Olympics

At the 2012 Summer Olympics, she reached the last 32 before being knocked out by Ksenia Perova, and was part of the Italian team that was knocked out by China in the first round.

Individual performance timeline

References

External links
 
 

1969 births
Living people
Italian female archers
Moldovan female archers
Soviet female archers
Olympic archers of the Unified Team
Olympic archers of Moldova
Olympic archers of Italy
Olympic bronze medalists for the Unified Team
Archers at the 1992 Summer Olympics
Archers at the 1996 Summer Olympics
Archers at the 2000 Summer Olympics
Archers at the 2004 Summer Olympics
Archers at the 2008 Summer Olympics
Archers at the 2012 Summer Olympics
People from Slobozia District
Moldovan emigrants to Italy
Naturalised citizens of Italy
Olympic medalists in archery
Archers at the 2015 European Games
European Games medalists in archery
European Games gold medalists for Italy
World Archery Championships medalists
Medalists at the 1992 Summer Olympics
Mediterranean Games gold medalists for Italy
Mediterranean Games bronze medalists for Italy
Competitors at the 2013 Mediterranean Games
Mediterranean Games medalists in archery
Italian people of Moldovan descent